From Beijing to Moscow is an original Toggle 13-episode romance-mystery series starring River Huang, Jojo Goh, Felicia Chin and Aloysius Pang. It premiered on 13 June 2019 on Toggle. This was Aloysius Pang's last drama before his death on 23 January that year.

Plot
Kaixiang (River Huang) lost his memory after an accident.

Cast
 River Huang as Kaixiang
 Jojo Goh as Xiaoqi
Felicia Chin as Kloudiia
 Aloysius Pang as Kenneth

Awards & Nominations

Asian Academy Creative Awards

Star Awards 2021

Production
From Beijing to Moscow was shot in a two-month road trip to China, Mongolia and Russia from August to October 2018.

References

2019 Singaporean television series debuts
2019 Singaporean television series endings
Mandarin-language television shows
Singaporean television series